William George "Twit" Tasker (15 October 1891 – 9 August 1918) was an Australian World War I soldier who had been a national representative rugby union player making six Test appearances for the Wallabies.

Early life
The third son of David Henry Tasker (-1920), and Helene Tasker (-1912), William George Tasker was born in Condobolin, New South Wales on 15 October 1891.

Tasker attended Newington College from (1906–1911). He captained the Newington First XV in 1911 and was selected in and captained the GPS Schools representative 1st XV in 1911. He stayed in Sydney after completing his schooling becoming a bank clerk whilst pursuing a rugby career.

Rugby career
He debuted for the Newtown Rugby Club in Sydney in 1912 and that same year at age 20 he captained the club's first-grade side.

He was selected in the Australia national rugby union squad which toured North America in 1912; although he did not play a Test. The squad was overwhelmed with hospitality and lacking strong management they reveled in the social life and undergraduate antics of the college fraternity houses in which they were billeted. In what must be the worst record of any Australian touring team, the squad lost all of their Canadian matches among five defeats.

Tasker was the first-ever Wallaby to be sent from the field. An incident occurred on the 1912 tour of the United States when Tasker's rough play upset an American referee.

Tasker made his Test debut at Athletic Park (Wellington) on the 1913 tour of New Zealand and played in all three Tests of that tour. The following year he made three further Test appearances when the All Blacks toured Australia in a return series.

War service
Tasker enlisted in the AIF in January 1915, a Gunner in the 12th Field Artillery Brigade, 13th Battalion (Australia). He took part in the Landing at Anzac Cove, landing late on 25 April 1915. From May to August, the 13th battalion was heavily involved in establishing and defending the ANZAC front lines.

Tasker was severely wounded at Quinn's Post at Gallipoli with shell fragment damage to his legs and ankle. He was invalided back to Australia. A rugby colleague also at Gallipoli, H.A Mitchell of the Manly Club wrote home of Tasker's injuries "A bomb loaded up Tasker's leg and ankle up with about 17 pieces of shot. It will be sometime before he can do any of that sidestepping he used to do".

In 1916 he re-enlisted with the 116th Howitzer Battery and he again embarked from Sydney on board HMAT A60 Aeneas on 30 September. He saw further action on the Western Front and was twice wounded.

Death

On 9 August 1918, Tasker was working with his artillery gun sights at Harbonnieres on the second day of the Battle of Amiens when a shell landed near the gun, mortally wounding him in the groin with shrapnel. He died later that day at the age of 26.

He is buried at the Villers-Bretonneux Military Cemetery.

The sporting journal The Referee reported: 

In the same issue, the sporting journalist, "The Rambler", made these comments:

Honours and awards

 British War Medal
 Victory Medal

See also
 List of international rugby union players killed in action during the First World War

Footnotes

References
 First World War Embarkation Roll: Private William George Tasker (1658), collection of the  Australian War Memorial.
 First World War Embarkation Roll: Corporal William George Tasker (29167), collection of the  Australian War Memorial.
 First World War Nominal Roll: Gunner William George Tasker (1658/29167), collection of the National Archive of Australia.
 Roll of Honour: 41st Casualty List: Wounded: New South Wales, The (Brisbane) Telegraph, (Saturday, 19 June 1915), p. 7.
 411th Casualty List: New South Wales: Wounded, The Sydney Morning Herald, (Tuesday, 25 June 1918), p. 8.
 428th Casualty List: New South Wales: Died of Wounds, The Sydney Morning Herald, (Tuesday 10 September 1918), p. 8.
 First World War Service Record: Gunner William George Tasker (1658/29167), collection of the National Archive of Australia.
 Australian Red Cross Society Wounded and Missing Enquiry Bureau files, 1914-18 War: 1DRL/0428: 29167 Gunner William George Tasker: 13th Field Artillery Brigade, collection of the  Australian War Memorial.
 Roll of Honour: Gunner William George Tasker (29167),  Australian War Memorial.
 Roll of Honour Circular: Gunner William George Tasker (29167), collection of the  Australian War Memorial.
 Collection (1995) Gordon Bray presents The Spirit of Rugby, Harper Collins Publishers Sydney
 Collection (1995) Gordon Bray presents The Spirit of Rugby, Harper Collins Publishers Sydney
 Howell, Max (2005) Born to Lead - Wallaby Test Captains, Celebrity Books, Auckland NZ
 Zavos, Spiro (2000) Golden Wallabies - The Story of Australia's Rugby World Champions, Penguin Books, Ringwood, Victoria

External links
 Twit Tasker at the AIF Project
 Gunner William George Tasker (29167), Commonwealth War Graves Commission.

1890s births
1918 deaths
Australian rugby union players
People educated at Newington College
Australian soldiers
Australian military personnel killed in World War I
Australia international rugby union players
Rugby union players from New South Wales
Rugby union fly-halves